Savatage has known several lineups during its active periods from 1979 to 1993, 1994 to 2002 and currently from 2014. The band was founded by brothers Jon (vocals, keys) and Criss Oliva (guitar) in the late 1970s, and the band's first stable line-up in the early eighties also included drummer Steve "Doc" Wacholz, and Keith Collins on bass. During the second half of eighties Collins was replaced by Johnny Lee Middleton, and the line-up was expanded to include second guitarist Chris Caffery. The nineties began with the band again down to four after Caffery's departure, and in 1992 Jon Oliva stepped down as frontman though he remained involved in songwriting. He was replaced by vocalist Zachary Stevens, though Oliva continued to collaborate in the studio. The band went on hiatus when guitarist Criss Oliva died in a car accident in 1993.

Jon Oliva reformed Savatage in 1994. The band again saw many members come and go during this second period, but had a solid lineup from 1995 to 2000 featuring the return of Middleton (bass), Stevens (vocals), and Caffery (guitar), along with new members Al Pitrelli (guitar) and Jeff Plate (drums), in addition to Oliva on keys. In 2000 Stevens and Pitrelli left the band, and Oliva took over lead vocals. However, in 2002 the band went on an indefinite hiatus until being reformed in 2014.

From 1987 on, Paul O'Neill acted as the band's producer, co-lyricist and co-composer, and leads Trans-Siberian Orchestra along with Jon Oliva and Al Pitrelli. Stevens, Middleton, Caffery and Plate also perform in Trans-Siberian Orchestra, and former guitarist Alex Skolnick has also performed with the group. In April 2017 it was announced that O'Neill had died at the age of 61.

Current members

Former members

Studio Personnel and Guest Musicians

Touring musicians

Avatar (pre-Savatage) members

Timeline

Lineups

References